Jump the Gun was an Irish pop/rock band, best known for competing in the Eurovision Song Contest 1988 with the song "Take Him Home". They scored 79 points, finishing eighth in the contest. Jump The Gun was succeeded by Kiev Connolly & The Missing Passengers in 1989.

The group consisted of Roy Taylor on lead vocals and Bass Guitar with Eric Sharpe on Guitar, Peter Eades on Piano & keyboards, Brian O'Reilly on Drums and Ciaran Wilde on Saxophone. Taylor had experienced success in Ireland during the early 1980s as part of the group, Roy Taylor, Karen Black and the Nevada.  Ciaran Wilde Joined the group shortly before the Eurovision in 1988, the other members of the group had all been members of Irish Show bands in the 80s.

Eurovision Song Contest entrants for Ireland
Eurovision Song Contest entrants of 1988